Damu was a Mesopotamian god. While originally regarded as a dying god connected to vegetation, similar to Dumuzi or Ningishzida, with time he acquired the traits of a god of healing. He was regarded as the son of the medicine goddess Ninisina, or of her equivalents such as Gula or Ninkarrak. It is unclear which city was originally associated with him, but he is best attested in association with the cult center of his mother, Isin.

Damu is also a theophoric element in many personal names from Ebla. It has been proposed that in this context the term should be understood as a deified kinship group rather than a deity, and it is assumed it is not connected to the Mesopotamian god.

Character

Damu was originally a dying god. In contrast with Dumuzi, who was described as a shepherd and was associated with herding animals, Damu was most likely connected with trees. From the Old Babylonian period onward he was known chiefly as a healing deity instead. This aspect of his character is absent from texts pertaining to his death, which according to Dina Katz might indicate that his character had been altered at some point, likely in the Old Babylonian period. She proposes that the change might had been facilitated by the loss of his original cult center and relocation of his clergy to Isin, where he was incorporated into the circle of the city goddess Ninisina and acquired similar traits as a result. Some laments nonetheless do connect the dying Damu with the medicine goddess, possibly indicating they were composed later.

As indicated by the incantation Ninisina, mother of the land, Damu was especially closely associated with care for strings (sa), a term possibly referring to sinew, muscles or blood vessels, envisioned as a single net-like system. There is also evidence that he was regarded as capable of healing headaches (di'u) and the unidentified ašû disease.

While other Mesopotamian dying gods were typically envisioned as young men, and were often referred to with the term g̃uruš, conventionally translated as "lad," according to Dina Katz Damu was most likely instead a young child, possibly an infant, as one lament explicitly describes him as not yet washed. She suggests that the high rates of infant mortality in the past influenced traditions pertaining to him. While at least one text refers to Damu as g̃uruš, it was composed no earlier than in the Old Babylonian period, and as such might be the result of conflation of various similar gods. 

Damu's attribute in the role of a medicine god was a karzillu knife, identified as a scalpel by Barbara Böck.

The Eblaite Damu
References to Damu from Ebla and Emar are unlikely to refer to the same deity as the Mesopotamian Damu. The theophoric element Damu occurs frequently in personal names from the first of these cities. While it likely had its origin in popular religion, it is particularly common among the members of the royal family, with twenty four out of fifty one sons and nine out of thirty one daughters of Eblaite kings having Damu names. Kings with such names include Irkab-Damu and Isar-Damu. At the same time, among women who married into the royal family, who were not otherwise related to it, only three bore Damu names. It is also comparatively less frequent among members of the family of the viziers Ibrium and Ibbi-Zikir. 

In Emar, the element Damu appears in the names of four kings who were contemporaries of the rulers known from Eblaite archives.

According to Alfonso Archi, in the Syrian context Damu should be translated as "blood," and refers to the concept of a deified kinship group. He notes that Damu does not appears in rituals pertaining to the royal family, which invoke various personified deities, such as the city god Kura, his spouse Barama and Ishara. No such a deity is present in any offering lists from Ebla either.

A similar term, Lim, denoted the deified clan, and is attested in Amorite names as well, unlike Damu, exclusive to Ebla and nearby Emar.

Worship
It is uncertain which city was originally associated with Damu, though Girsu or Isin are regarded as the most plausible options. Thorkild Jacobsen proposed that Girsu associated with Damu was not the same as the city located near Lagash, but a different settlement perhaps located on the bank of the Euphrates, but his argument relies entirely on his proposed etymology of this city name, "prisoner camp," which according to him indicates that there could had been multiple places named Girsu. No evidence for his theory has been found in any textual sources.

A temple of Damu whose name is not preserved in known sources existed in Isin. He is mentioned in a ritual text describing a procession of Ninisina and her court, during which he and Gunura were supposed to be placed right behind their mother. In Nippur he was worshiped in the temple of his mother alongside deities such as Kurunnam, Kusu, Urmah, Nusku, Ninimma, Shuzianna, Belet-Seri, the Sebitti (treated as a single deity), Bel-aliya (an anonymous "divine mayor"), Sirash and Ningirzida. He is also attested in texts from Larsa and Ur. 

Many medical formulas end with an invocation of the medicine goddess Gula/Ninisina, Damu, and deities connected with incantations: Ea, his son Asalluhi, and the goddess Ningirima:

An example from Ugarit replaces Gula with another medicine goddess, Ninkarrak. Other incantations pairing Ninkarrak with Damu are known too:

Connections with other deities
The mother of Damu was usually Ninisina or Gula. It is possible that the latter was simply an epithet which developed into a separate deity. Less commonly Ninkarrak could be placed in this role too. One lament calls Damu's mother Geshtinluba, according to Dina Katz an Emesal version of the name Nintinugga. Damu's father was Pabilsag, while his sister was Gunura, according to Dina Katz possibly regarded as his sibling even before he was incorporated into the circle of Ninisina. One more deity regarded as a member of this family was Šumah, another son of Ninisina and Pabilsag.

In earliest god lists, Damu is typically listed alongside the deities of the state of Lagash, though from the Old Babylonian period onward he started to be placed in the court of Ninisina instead. 

Texts about Damu show similarity with these pertaining to Dumuzi and other similar prematurely dying deities, such as Ningishzida. One  lament mentions both him and Damu. Instances where they were identified with each other are known too.

Mythology
Myths involving Damu deal with his death, and have been compared to compositions such as Ningishzida and Ninazimua, Dumuzi and his sisters, Dumuzi and Geshtinanna, Dumuzi's dream and Inanna's descent. Many of them contain detailed descriptions of grief caused by his disappearance, which have been characterized as "visceral" by researchers. Laments describing his death and separation from his family usually described the location of the underworld in vague terms. One example is the composition For him in the far-off land. Damu is mentioned in a text listing various dying gods and the places of their demise, but the location is not preserved in his case. While the galla demons could be identified as responsible for his death, it was not equally common as associating them with Dumuzi's demise.

In one lament, Damu's mother offers to walk the road to the underworld with him. A neo-Assyrian copy of this text contains the names of nine deities rather than just Damu, even though the original composition is only about him. The other eight deities listed are Ninazu, Ningishzida, Alla, Umunshudi, Ishtaran, Mulusiranna, Amaushumgalanna and "brother of Gesthinanna." Damu himself is placed between Ninazu and Ningishzida in this version. A further difference is the identification of the dying god himself as the narrator. 

The death of Damu could also be mentioned in laments related to the cult of Ninisina or Gula, alongside the destruction of the city of Isin and temples located in it. Next to Inanna laments related to the death of Dumuzi, Ninisina laments are the most common among known literary texts of this genre. In one such text, the goddess directs her lamentation over the death of her son to the Eanna temple.

A hymn to Ninisina relays how Damu was taught by her how to use medical implements and diagnose illnesses:

References

Bibliography

Mesopotamian gods
Medicine gods